Yrjö Miettinen (8 May 1913 – 17 May 1969) was a Finnish sports shooter. He competed in the 100 m running deer event at the 1952 Summer Olympics.

References

External links
 

1913 births
1969 deaths
Finnish male sport shooters
Olympic shooters of Finland
Shooters at the 1952 Summer Olympics
People from Lapinlahti
Sportspeople from North Savo